Vicente "Enzo" Potolicchio (born 7 August 1968 in Caracas) is a Venezuelan racing driver and businessman, who competes in the FIA World Endurance Championship and Rolex Sports Car Series for Starworks Motorsport. He won the 2012 24 Hours of Le Mans and 2012 12 Hours of Sebring, both in the LMP2 class.

Early racing career
Potolicchio spent his early career racing Formula Ford, both at home in Venezuela where he was champion in 2005, and in the American F2000 Championship Series. He also took part in Venezuelan Porsche Super Cup in 1998, which saw him earn 11 victories and the country's Automobile Driver of the Year award.

Ferrari Challenge
Potolicchio participated in two Ferrari Challenge North America races in 2009, earning a victory and a third-place finish. In 2010 and 2011 he won back-to-back Ferrari Challenge titles.

Rolex Sports Car Series
Potolicchio made his Grand-Am debut in 2011, racing in the Rolex Sports Car Series for Starworks Motorsport. He earned his first career victory at Mid-Ohio, teamed with Ryan Dalziel, finishing 13th in the end-of-season Daytona Prototype points standings.

In 2012, Potolicchio finished second overall in the 2012 24 Hours of Daytona, teamed with Ryan Dalziel, Alex Popow, Lucas Luhr and Allan McNish. He has collected four podium finishes in eight races to date.

Leading up to the second race at Watkins Glen, Potolicchio announced he was leaving the Rolex Series, but would continue to support the No. 8 Starworks car in the title challenge.

FIA World Endurance Championship
Together with Starworks, Potolicchio made his FIA World Endurance Championship debut at the 2012 12 Hours of Sebring, where he, Ryan Dalziel and Stéphane Sarrazin finished third overall and first in LMP2. The trio finished 14th in class at the Six Hours of Spa-Francorchamps, punctuated by a mechanical issue.

Potolicchio and teammates Ryan Dalziel and Tom Kimber-Smith won the Le Mans in the LMP2 class. Starworks also won the FIA LMP2 Trophy in the 2012 FIA World Endurance Championship season.

In 2013, Potolicchio announced that he would enter the 2013 FIA WEC season with his newly created team, 8Star Motorsports, competing with one Ferrari 458 Italia GT2.

Complete motorsports results

American Open-Wheel racing results
(key) (Races in bold indicate pole position, races in italics indicate fastest race lap)

USF2000 National Championship results

Complete IMSA SportsCar Championship results
(key) (Races in bold indicate pole position) (Races in italics indicate fastest lap)

Complete FIA World Endurance Championship results

24 Hours of Le Mans results

References

External links
 

1968 births
Living people
People from Caracas
Venezuelan racing drivers
Formula Ford drivers
Rolex Sports Car Series drivers
24 Hours of Le Mans drivers
24 Hours of Daytona drivers
FIA World Endurance Championship drivers
Venezuelan people of Italian descent
WeatherTech SportsCar Championship drivers
Blancpain Endurance Series drivers
24 Hours of Spa drivers
U.S. F2000 National Championship drivers
Starworks Motorsport drivers
United Autosports drivers
Graff Racing drivers
European Le Mans Series drivers
AF Corse drivers
Ferrari Challenge drivers